Ghobash is an Emirati surname.

List of people with the surname 

 Omar Saif Ghobash (born 1971), Emirati diplomat and author
 Saif Ghobash (1932–1977), Emirati diplomat and engineer
 Saqr Ghobash, Emirati politician

See also 

 Ghorashal

Surnames
Surnames of Arabic origin